Kopce  is a village in the administrative district of Gmina Janów Lubelski, within Janów Lubelski County, Lublin Voivodeship, in eastern Poland.

The village has a population of 28.

References

Kopce